Paul Newe (born 20 April 1964 in Dublin) is an Irish former footballer.

Newe began his career at Shamrock Rovers but failed to make a first team appearance. He made his League of Ireland debut with Shelbourne on 3 October 1982, and played with the club twice during the 1980s and 1990s, scoring 38 league goals in 116 league appearances. Newe also played for Drogheda United, Dundalk FC, Cobh Ramblers, St. Patrick's Athletic, Monaghan United, Longford Town and Limerick F.C.

While at Flancare Park Newe scored his 100th League of Ireland goal on 13 April 1996 at Cobh Ramblers.

At the end of the 2012 League of Ireland season Newe is joint fortieth in the all-time League of Ireland goalscoring list with 103 league goals

Honours
League of Ireland
 Dundalk F.C. - 1988/89
FAI Cup
 Dundalk F.C. - 1988

References

Republic of Ireland association footballers
Association football forwards
Shamrock Rovers F.C. players
Shelbourne F.C. players
Drogheda United F.C. players
Dundalk F.C. players
Cobh Ramblers F.C. players
St Patrick's Athletic F.C. players
Monaghan United F.C. players
Longford Town F.C. players
Limerick F.C. players
League of Ireland players
1964 births
Living people